Damkhat Reachea (died 1508) was a Cambodian king and emperor, Thomuro Reachea uncle's successor, which is known relatively few on his life.
In the year 1508, he was murdered by an adventurer named Kan, who usurped his throne.

References

Year of birth missing
1508 deaths
16th-century Cambodian monarchs